Olenecamptus albidus is a species of beetle in the family Cerambycidae. It was described by Karl Jordan in 1894.

Subspecies
 Olenecamptus albidus albidus Jordan, 1894
 Olenecamptus albidus leonensis Dillon & Dillon, 1948
 Olenecamptus albidus natalensis Dillon & Dillon, 1948

References

Dorcaschematini
Beetles described in 1894